Peru competed at the 2012 Winter Youth Olympics in Innsbruck, Austria. The Peruvian team was made up of one female athlete competing in alpine skiing.

Alpine skiing

Peru has qualified one girl in alpine skiing.

Isabella Todd is an American who was discovered by Peru's first athlete to qualify for an Olympic Winter Games, Roberto Carcelén. Todd qualifies as a Peruvian through her mother who was born in Peru.

Girl

See also
Peru at the 2012 Summer Olympics

References

2012 in Peruvian sport
Nations at the 2012 Winter Youth Olympics
Peru at the Youth Olympics